The Statue of the Bear and the Strawberry Tree (in Spanish “El Oso y el Madroño”) is a sculpture from the second half of the 20th century, situated in the Spanish city of Madrid. It represents the coat of arms of Madrid and is found on the east side of the Puerta del Sol, between Calle de Alcalá and Carrera de San Jerónimo, in the historical centre of the capital.

History 
The statue is a work of the sculptor  (1906-1983) and it was inaugurated on 19 January 1967. It was promoted by the section of Culture of the City council of Madrid, which wanted to represent the main heraldic symbols of the city in a monument.

The first appearance of a wild bear and a strawberry tree on the coat of arms of the city was in the 13th century. Previously, it only incorporated a bear in passant attitude, until it was replaced in the aforementioned century by the two current figures. With this change, they wanted to symbolise the resolution adopted by the municipality and the Chapter of Priests and Beneficiaries after a long litigation about the control of Madrilenian pastures and trees. Since this agreement, the former became property of the Chapter and the latter of the council. From here they modified the arms, including a strawberry tree and of a bear in a new posture: leaning on the tree with both paws.

The sculpture has always been in the Puerta del Sol, but in two locations inside the square. Before 1986, it was situated in the east side of it, in the vicinity of the building between the Calle de Alcalá and the Carrera St. Jerónimo. That year, it was moved to the front of Carmen Street for the square's reform and remodeling, promoted by mayor Enrique Tierno Galván. In September 2009, with the integral renewal of the square promoted by Alberto Ruiz-Gallardón, it has gone back to its original location.

Description 
The Statue of the Bear and the Strawberry Tree is made of stone and bronze. It weighs approximately 22 tons (20 tonnes) and stands 13 ft (4 m) tall. It rests on a staggered cubic pedestal of granite.

It represents in a real-life form the coat of arms of Madrid, with the tree taller than the bear, who supports his paws on the trunk and directs his attention towards one of the fruits.

See also 
 Shield of Madrid
 Flag of Madrid.

References

External links 

 General information the statue of the statue at www.madridhistorico.com (Spanish)
 Information on the movement of the statue at www.elpais.com (Spanish)

1967 sculptures
Bear and the Strawberry Tree
Sculptures of bears
Animal sculptures
Outdoor sculptures in Madrid
Strawberries